Pesch is a surname. Notable people with the surname include:

 Doro Pesch (born 1964), German singer
 Heinrich Pesch (1854–1926),  German Jesuit and economist
 Jean-Louis Pesch (real name: Jean-Louis Poisson) (born 1928), French author of comics series
 Marcel Pesch (1910–1985), Luxembourgian cyclist
 Nick Pesch (born 1974), Australian rules footballer
 Tilman Pesch (1836–1899), 19th-century German Jesuit philosopher

Fictional characters:
 Miriam Pesch, minor character in Verbotene Liebe

See also

 Pesch, Cologne, part of Chorweiler, Cologne, Germany
 Jack Pesch Bridge, bridge for pedestrians and cyclists which crosses the Brisbane River
 9399 Pesch, main-belt asteroid

German-language surnames